Pyramidelloides carinatus is a species of sea snail, a marine gastropod mollusk in the family Eulimidae. The species is one of a number within the genus Pyramidelloides.

Description 
The maximum recorded shell length is 1.8 mm.

Habitat 
Minimum recorded depth is 0 m. Maximum recorded depth is 90 m.

References

External links
 To World Register of Marine Species

Eulimidae
Gastropods described in 1876